Pembina was a provincial electoral division in the Canadian province of Manitoba.

1878-1879

The original riding of Pembina was created in 1878, in what was then the southwestern corner of the province.  It was eliminated in 1879.  The riding's sole Member of the Legislative Assembly was John Stevenson, who was elected in opposition to John Norquay's government, but supported Norquay's short-lived anglophone ministry in 1879.

1958-2011

The most recent Pembina constituency was created by redistribution in 1956, and existed from the 1958 provincial election until the 2011 election.

Pembina was located in the southern part of the province. It was bordered to the north by Carman, to the east by Emerson, to the west by Turtle Mountain, and to the south by the American state of North Dakota.

The main communities in the riding were Morden and Winkler.

Pembina's population in 1996 was 20,177.  In 1999, the average family income was $44,624, and the unemployment rate was 5.00%.  Manufacturing accounts for 17% of the riding's industry, followed by agriculture at 16%.  A quarter of the riding's population has less than a Grade Nine education. Twenty-four per cent of the riding's residents listed German as their ethnic origin, followed by Mennonites at 9% and Dutch at 8%.

The riding was only held by the Progressive Conservative Party, and was considered extremely safe for that party. The last MLA, Peter George Dyck, was re-elected with over 75% of the vote in 2003, despite his party losing other seats across the province.

Following the 2008 electoral redistribution, Pembina was dissolved into Emerson and the newly created ridings of Midland and Morden-Winkler for the 2011 election.

Member of the Legislative Assembly

Electoral results

1878 general election

1958 general election

1959 general election

1960 by-election

1962 general election

1966 general election

1969 general election

1973 general election

1977 general election

1981 general election

1986 general election

1988 general election

1990 general election

1995 general election

1999 general election

2003 general election

2007 general election

References

Former provincial electoral districts of Manitoba
Morden, Manitoba
Winkler, Manitoba